The Tullahan  River is a river in the Philippines. It starts at the La Mesa Reservoir in Quezon City and flows through Caloocan, Malabon, Valenzuela. and Navotas and empties into Manila Bay. In 2019, San Miguel Corporation pledges  for the cleanup of the Tullahan River as part of the Manila Bay rehabilitation effort.

Bridges

Navotas
R-10 Bridge (C-4 - R-10)
Bangkulasi Bridge

Malabon
C-4 Bridge I
Malabon Bridge
Lambingan Bridge
Tinajeros Bridge
Harbor Link Bridge - includes the rail bridge of PNR

Valenzuela-Malabon
Tullahan Bridge (MacArthur Highway)
White Lily Bridge

Valenzuela-Caloocan (South)
Tullahan Bridge (North Luzon Expressway)
Ugong Bridge
Doña Candida Bridge

Valenzuela-Quezon City
Maceda Bridge
Tullahan Bridge 3 (Mindanao Avenue)

Quezon City
Katipunan Bridge
San Dionisio Bridge
Gozum Bridge
Tullahan I Bridge (Quirino Highway)
Forest Hill Bridge
Bagong Tulay Bridge
Accountant Street Bridge
Tullahan II Bridge (Commonwealth Avenue)

See also
 List of rivers and esteros in Manila

References

External links 

 Satellite image
 Wikimapia entry

Rivers of Metro Manila